The sweat bee genus Lasioglossum is the largest of all bee genera, containing over 1700 species in numerous subgenera worldwide. They are highly variable in size, coloration, and sculpture; among the more unusual variants, some are cleptoparasites, some are nocturnal, and some are oligolectic. Most Lasioglossum species nest in the ground, but some nest in rotten logs.

Social behavior among species of Lasioglossum is extraordinarily variable; species are  known  to  exhibit  solitary  nesting,   primitive   eusociality,  and  social  parasitism.  Colony  sizes  vary  widely, from  small  colonies  of  a  single  queen  four  or  fewer workers to large colonies  of  >400  workers  and  perennial  life  cycles.<ref name="DanforthEtAl">{{Cite journal|last1=Danforth|first1=Bryan N.|last2=Conway|first2=Lindsay|last3=Ji|first3=Shuqing|date=2003-02-01|title=Phylogeny of eusocial Lasioglossum''' reveals multiple losses of eusociality within a primitively eusocial clade of bees (Hymenoptera: Halictidae)|journal=Systematic Biology|volume=52|issue=1|pages=23–36|doi=10.1080/10635150390132687|pmid=12554437 |issn=1063-5157|doi-access=free}}</ref>

The genus Lasioglossum can be divided into two informal series based on the strength of the distal veins of the forewing. The Lasioglossum series (or strong-veined Lasioglossum) is mostly composed of solitary or communal species, even if some species like L. aegyptiellum show signs of division of labour indicative of eusociality.

The Hemihalictus series (or weak-veined Lasioglossum) includes species with a wide range of sociality. The Hemihalictus series is composed of species which are solitary, communal, primitively eusocial, cleptoparasitic, or socially parasitic. Eusocial species may have small colonies with only one or a few workers or large colonies with dozens of workers. Large colony sizes occur in L. marginatum, which forms perennial colonies lasting five or six years, with hundreds of workers;  this species is the only halictine bee with perennial colonies.

Subgenera

A list of subgenera (modified from Michener's Bees of the World):Lasioglossum series: Australictus, Callalictus, Chilalictus, Ctenonomia, Echthralictus, Glossalictus, Lasioglossum s. str., Leuchalictus, Oxyhalictus, Parasphecodes, Pseudochilalictus, Rubrihalictus, Urohalictus.Hemihalictus series: Acanthalictus, Austrevylaeus, Dialictus, Evylaeus, Hemihalictus, Homalictus, Paradialictus, Sellalictus, Sphecodogastra, Sudila.

Subgeneric classification of Lasioglossum remains controversial, with disagreement among experts on the number and extent of subgenera.

Two of the better-known species are the European Lasioglossum malachurum and the North American species Lasioglossum zephyrus''.

See also
 List of Lasioglossum species

References

External links
 Lasioglossum  Identification Guide
 List of Species
Worldwide Species Map

 
Bee genera
Taxa named by John Curtis